As a surname, "Goodspeed" derives from "Godspeed", which in turn comes from the expression "God speed (you)", a wish for success and fortune on behalf of one setting out on a trip or an enterprise.

People with the surname
Dan Goodspeed (born 1977), US athlete in football
Edgar J. Goodspeed (1871–1962), US theologian, scholar and author of numerous writings about the Bible
Estella Goodspeed and Allen Goodspeed, wife and son of Arthur Scott Bailey 
Joey Goodspeed (born 1978), US athlete in football
Marjorie Reynolds (1917–1997), US film actress, born Marjorie Goodspeed
Paula Goodspeed (1978–2008), US singer and American Idol auditioner, accused stalker of Paula Abdul
 Tyler Goodspeed (b. 1984/85), American economist

In fiction
Ethan Rom, alias of Dr. Ethan Goodspeed, a character in the US television series Lost
Gary Goodspeed, the main character of the US animated television series Final Space
Horace Goodspeed, a character in the US television series Lost
Patience Goodspeed, the main character in The Voyage of Patience Goodspeed and The Education of Patience Goodspeed, by Heather Vogel Frederick
Dr. Stanley Goodspeed, a character in the 1996 US film The Rock

References